Joseph Easton Gary (July 9, 1821 – October 31, 1906) was judge who presided over the trial of eight anarchists tried for their alleged role in the Haymarket Riot. Born in Potsdam, New York, USA, he worked as a carpenter, then moved to St. Louis in 1843 to study law. He was admitted to the bar in 1844 and practiced for five years in Springfield, Missouri. In 1849 he moved to Las Vegas, which was then part of the State of Deseret, and established a practice there. He then moved after three years to San Francisco, then to Berlin, Wisconsin, before moving to Chicago in 1856.

Haymarket 8 trial 
Gary practiced law until 1863, when he was elected a judge. He presided over the Haymarket Riot case in 1886, sentencing anarchists August Spies, Michael Schwab, Samuel Fielden, Albert Parsons, Adolph Fischer, George Engel, and Louis Lingg to death and Oscar Neebe to 15 years.

There was no evidence that any of the defendants had any connection with the bombing. Gary allowed them to be convicted on the theory that their speeches had encouraged the unknown bomber to commit the act. During the trial, anarchist sympathizers frequently made death threats against him, raising his general popularity.

Subsequent career

In 1888 he was appointed by the Supreme Court to the Appellate Court for the First District of Illinois. He returned to the Superior Court of Cook County in 1897, and that year, presided over the sensational murder trial of Adolph Luetgert. Both the Republicans and the Democrats nominated him each time he ran for judge, a position he held continuously from 1863 to 1906. He was still active as a judge at the time of his death, the oldest judge on his court. He held court on the morning before his death, became ill the next morning, and died at home just after noon.

In April 1907, a special election was held to fill the remaining four years of his term. Republican William H. McSurely narrowly defeated Democrat William Emmett Dever.

Personal life
In 1855, Gary married Elizabeth Jane Swelting, in Berlin, Wisconsin.

References

Bibliography
 "Judge Gary Dead.", The New York Times, November 1, 1906.

1821 births
1906 deaths
People from Potsdam, New York
Lawyers from Chicago
Illinois state court judges
Haymarket affair
Judges of the Superior Court of Cook County
Missouri lawyers
American carpenters
19th-century American judges